Habsheim is a commune in the Haut-Rhin department in Alsace in north-eastern France. It forms part of the Mulhouse Alsace Agglomération, the inter-communal local government body for the Mulhouse conurbation.

History 
It was built during World War I by German soldiers and Romanian prisoners of war as a military light railway.

Population

See also
 Communes of the Haut-Rhin département
 Mulhouse-Habsheim Airport

References

Communes of Haut-Rhin